The Secondary Mortgage Market Enhancement Act of 1984 (SMMEA) was an Act of Congress intended to improve the marketability of private label mortgage-backed security passthroughs. It is mentioned as a significant contributing factor in the subprime mortgage crisis.

It declared nationally recognized statistical rating organization (NRSRO) AA-rated mortgage-backed securities to be legal investments equivalent to Treasury securities and other federal government bonds for federally chartered banks (such as federal savings banks, federal savings associations, etc.), state-chartered financial institutions (such as depository banks and insurance companies) unless overridden by state law before October 1991 (of which 21 states did so), and Department of Labor-regulated pension funds.

References

 
 

1984 in law
1984 in economics
Affordable housing
United States federal banking legislation
Subprime mortgage crisis